Union Carquefou-Sainte Luce Basket are a French basketball club based in the town of Sainte-Luce-sur-Loire, near Nantes in western France. The team plays in the NM2 division, which is the fourth tier of French basketball.

Notable players

James Wade (2008–2009)

External links
Official Website 

Basketball teams in France
Sport in Loire-Atlantique